Lieven Dehandschutter (born 9 June 1958 in Sint-Niklaas) is a Belgian politician and is affiliated to the N-VA. He was elected as a member of the Flemish Parliament in 2009.

Notes

Living people
Mayors of places in Belgium
Members of the Flemish Parliament
New Flemish Alliance politicians
1958 births
People from East Flanders
21st-century Belgian politicians
People from Sint-Niklaas